San Mateo station is the northernmost of the three Caltrain stations in San Mateo, California. It is in downtown San Mateo.

History

The first station serving downtown San Mateo was located between 2nd and 3rd at Railroad. On June 15, 1883, a "disastrous fire" destroyed San Mateo's Central block, located across the street from the station. Antoine Borel donated a lot in the block burned clear by the fire which become the site of the first public library in San Mateo; that building, named "Library Hall", was later converted to serve as City Hall. The depot and Library Hall both sustained damage in the 1906 San Francisco earthquake. Library Hall and the old depot were torn down in 1976, and a parking structure was erected on the old site. Today, the site holds a 12-screen cinema, and a mural in the courtyard pays homage to Library Hall.

The second station was located one block south of the first, between 3rd and 4th. The San Francisco Municipal Railway 40 San Mateo interurban line terminated at this station. Trains stopping at the second station would block automobile traffic on major downtown streets, since the center boarding platform was between 3rd and 4th. It was replaced in 2000, following the completion of an $11 million project to relocate the station.

The third and current station lies completely north of 1st, and there are no at-grade crossings for automotive traffic in the station platform area. A large mural entitled "Mr. Ralston Racing the Train", showing a race between a stagecoach and the train, was painted in 2000 by Nick Motley and "Little" Bobby Duncan under a commission from Eric Pennington on the exterior of an auto body shop at 1st and Railroad, near the south end of the northbound platform; a new mural entitled "Good Life" replaced it in 2016. "Good Life" was painted by Brian Barneclo, who also created one of the longest murals in San Francisco near the 4th and King station.

Bridges

Just north of the station are four steel rail bridges crossing (from south to north) Tilton, Monte Diablo, E. Santa Inez, and E. Poplar avenues, the earliest grade separations on the Southern Pacific Coast Line (between San Francisco and Gilroy) and among the earliest grade separations in the entire state. The four rail bridges were built by the American Bridge Company for Southern Pacific in 1903, and sacrificial steel beams were added in 2006 to prevent damage from vehicle strikes. The bridges had low vertical clearances as they predate the prevalence of automobile transport:
 Tilton: 
 Monte Diablo: 
 Santa Inez: 
 Poplar: 

Because the original rail bridges did not meet modern seismic safety standards, Caltrain and the City of San Mateo replaced the bridges during a project completed in October 2016. Planning for the bridge replacement started over a decade earlier. Lowering the roadways was not possible due to interference with subsurface utilities.

References

External links

Caltrain San Mateo station page
 
 

Caltrain stations in San Mateo County, California
Railway stations in the United States opened in 2000
Former Southern Pacific Railroad stations in California